The Parliament Acts 1911 and 1949 are two Acts of the Parliament of the United Kingdom, which form part of the constitution of the United Kingdom. Section 2(2) of the Parliament Act 1949 provides that the two Acts are to be construed as one.

The Parliament Act 1911 (1 & 2 Geo. 5. c. 13) asserted the supremacy of the House of Commons by limiting the legislation-blocking powers of the House of Lords (the suspensory veto). Provided the provisions of the Act are met, legislation can be passed without the approval of the House of Lords. Additionally, the 1911 Act amended the Septennial Act 1716 to reduce the maximum life of a Parliament from seven years to five years. The Parliament Act 1911 was amended by the Parliament Act 1949 (12, 13 & 14 Geo. 6. c. 103), which further limited the power of the Lords by reducing the time that they could delay bills, from two years to one.

The Parliament Acts have been used to pass legislation against the wishes of the House of Lords on seven occasions since 1911, including the passing of the Parliament Act 1949. Some constitutional lawyers had questioned the validity of the 1949 Act. These doubts were rejected in 2005 when members of the Countryside Alliance unsuccessfully challenged the validity of the Hunting Act 2004, which had been passed under the auspices of the Act. In October 2005, the Appellate Committee of the House of Lords dismissed the Alliance's appeal against this decision, with an unusually large panel of nine Law Lords (out of then-existing twelve) holding that the 1949 Act was a valid Act of Parliament.

Parliament Act 1911

Background

The 1911 Act was a reaction to the clash between the Liberal government and the House of Lords, culminating in the so-called "People's Budget" of 1909. In this Budget, the Chancellor of the Exchequer David Lloyd George proposed the introduction of a land tax based on the ideas of the American tax reformer Henry George. This new tax would have had a major effect on large landowners, and was opposed by the Conservative opposition, many of whom were large landowners themselves. The Conservatives believed that money should be raised through the introduction of tariffs on imports, which they claimed would help British industry. Contrary to British constitutional convention, the Conservatives used their large majority in the Lords to vote down the Budget. The Liberals made reducing the power of the Lords an important issue of the January 1910 general election.

The Liberals returned in a hung parliament after the election: their call for action against the Lords had energised believers in hereditary principle to vote for the Conservatives, but had failed to generate much interest with the rest of the voting public. The Liberals formed a minority government with the support of the Labour and Irish nationalist MPs. The Lords subsequently accepted the Budget. However, as a result of the dispute over the Budget, the new government introduced resolutions (that would later form the Parliament Bill) to limit the power of the Lords. The Prime Minister, H. H. Asquith, asked King Edward VII to create sufficient new Liberal peers to pass the Bill if the Lords rejected it. The King said he would not be willing to do so unless Asquith obtained a clear mandate for such sweeping change by winning a second general election.

The Lords voted this 1910 Bill down. Edward VII had died in May 1910, but his son George V agreed to grant Asquith a second general election in December 1910 (this also resulted in a minority government), and at the time he agreed that, if necessary, he would create  hundreds of new Liberal peers to neutralise the Conservative majority in the Lords. The Conservative Lords then backed down, and on 10 August 1911, the House of Lords passed the Parliament Act by a narrow 131–114 vote, with the support of some two dozen Conservative peers and eleven of thirteen Lords Spiritual.

The Parliament Act was intended as a temporary measure. The preamble states:

One of the reasons for the Irish Parliamentary Party MPs' support for the Parliament Act, and the bitterness of the Unionist resistance, was that the loss of the Lords' veto would make possible Irish Home Rule (i.e. a devolved legislature). The previous Liberal government's attempt to initiate Irish Home Rule had been vetoed by the House of Lords in 1893: at the time of his retirement in 1894, William Ewart Gladstone had not attracted sufficient support from his colleagues for a battle with the House of Lords. The Parliament Act resulted in the eventual enactment of the Irish Home Rule Government of Ireland Act 1914.

Provisions
The Act abolished any power of the House of Lords to veto any public Bill introduced in the House of Commons other than a Bill containing any provision to extend the maximum duration of Parliament beyond five years or a Bill for confirming a Provisional Order. The Act does not affect Bills introduced in the House of Lords, private Bills, or delegated legislation.

The effect of the Act is that the House of Lords can delay those Bills that it could formerly veto. If they have been sent up to the House of Lords at least one month before the end of the Session, Money Bills can be delayed for up to one month after being sent up, and other Bills can be delayed for up to one year after being sent up. The period for which Bills other than Money Bills could be delayed was originally two years. The Speaker was given the power to certify which bills are classified as money bills.

Section 1: Powers of House of Lords as to Money Bills
Section 1(1) provides:

The word "month" means calendar month.

Section 1(2) defines the expression "Money Bill".

Section 1(3) provides:

Section 2: Restriction of the powers of the House of Lords as to Bills other than Money Bills
This section originally provided that a Bill, to which this section applied, which was rejected by the House of Lords, would be presented for Royal Assent if it was passed by the Commons in three successive sessions, provided that two years had elapsed between Second Reading of the Bill and its final passing in the Commons, notwithstanding that the Lords had not consented to the Bill.

Section 1 of the Parliament Act 1949 provides that the Parliament Act 1911 has effect, and is deemed to have had effect from the beginning of the session in which the Bill for the Parliament Act 1949 originated (save as regards that Bill itself), as though sections 2(1) and (4), of Parliament Act 1911, read as they are printed in the following revised text of section 2 of that Act:

The words in square brackets are those substituted by section 1 of the Parliament Act 1949.

Before it was repealed in 1986, the proviso to section 1 of the Parliament Act 1949 read:

This proviso provided for the application of the Parliament Act 1911 to any Bill rejected for the second time by the House of Lords before the Royal Assent was given to the Parliament Act 1949 on 16 December 1949. In a report dated 27 September 1985, the Law Commission and the Scottish Law Commission said that this proviso had never been invoked and was, by that date, incapable of being invoked. They recommended that it be repealed.

Section 6: Saving for existing rights and privileges of the House of Commons
This section provides:

The Prime Minister, H. H. Asquith, said of the clause that became this section:

Section 7: Duration of Parliament
This section amended the Septennial Act 1715, reducing the maximum duration of any Parliament from seven years to five.

The President of the Board of Education, Walter Runciman, said:

This section was repealed by the Fixed-term Parliaments Act 2011 for the United Kingdom on 15 September 2011, when parliament was given a fixed five-year term.

Repeal in Ireland
This Act was repealed for the Republic of Ireland on 16 May 1983 by section 1 of, and Part IV of the Schedule to, the Statute Law Revision Act 1983 (No.11).

Parliament Act 1949 

Immediately after the Second World War, the Labour government of Clement Attlee decided to amend the 1911 Act to reduce further the power of the Lords, as a result of their fears that their radical programme of nationalisation would be delayed by the Lords and hence would not be completed within the life of the parliament. The House of Lords did not interfere with nationalisations in 1945 or 1946, but it was feared that the proposed nationalisation of the iron and steel industry would be a bridge too far, so a bill was introduced in 1947 to reduce the time that the Lords could delay bills, from three sessions over two years to two sessions over one year. The Lords attempted to block this change. The Bill was reintroduced in 1948 and again in 1949, before the 1911 Act was finally used to force it through. Since the 1911 Act required a delay over three "sessions", a special short "session" of parliament was introduced in 1948, with a King's Speech on 14 September 1948, and prorogation on 25 October.

The amended Parliament Act was never used in the 1940s or 1950s, possibly because the mere threat of it was enough. The Salisbury convention that the Lords would not block government bills that were mentioned in the government's manifesto dates from this time. Salisbury believed that since, in being returned to power, the Government was given a clear mandate for the policies proposed in its manifesto, it would be improper for the Lords to frustrate such legislation.

In every Bill presented to the Sovereign under sections 1 to 3 of the Parliament Act 1911 (as amended) the words of enactment are:

The usual enacting formula, used on other Acts, also refers to the advice and consent of the Lords Spiritual and Temporal, and omits the reference to the Parliament Acts.

Use of the Parliament Acts
The original form of the 1911 Act was used three times. These were:
 Government of Ireland Act 1914, which would have established a Home Rule government in Ireland; its implementation was blocked due to the First World War.
 Welsh Church Act 1914, under which the Welsh part of the Church of England was disestablished in 1920, becoming the Church in Wales.
 Parliament Act 1949, which amended the Parliament Act 1911 (discussed above).

The amended form of the 1911 Act has been used four times. These were:
 War Crimes Act 1991, which extended jurisdiction of UK courts to acts committed on behalf of Nazi Germany during the Second World War (the only time – to date – that the Parliament Acts have been used by a Conservative government).
 European Parliamentary Elections Act 1999, which changed the system of elections to the European Parliament from first past the post to a form of proportional representation.
 Sexual Offences (Amendment) Act 2000, which equalised the age of consent for male homosexual sexual activities with that for heterosexual and female homosexual sexual activities at 16.
 Hunting Act 2004, which prohibited hare coursing and (subject to some exceptions) all hunting of wild mammals (particularly foxes) with dogs after early 2005.

The Welsh Church Act and the Government of Ireland Act were both given Royal Assent on the same day as the Suspensory Act 1914, which meant that neither would come into force until after the War.

After the Labour government came to power in 1997, there was repeated speculation that it would rely on the Parliament Acts to reverse a check from the Lords, but it did not prove necessary. The Parliament Acts were not required to enact, for example, the Criminal Justice (Mode of Trial) (No 2) Bill in 2000 (which originally proposed to give magistrates, not defendants, the choice of where an "either way" offence would be tried) because the government abandoned the bill after a wrecking amendment in the House of Lords. The Parliament Act was threatened to be used to get the Identity Cards Act 2006 passed through the Lords. This was backed up by a threat of an immediate introduction of a compulsory ID Card scheme. The Lords had no option but to accept a compromise of a delay in the introduction of the scheme. The Parliament Acts cannot be used to force through legislation that originated in the House of Lords, so they could not have been used to enact the Civil Partnerships Act 2004 or the Constitutional Reform Act 2005.

The first three measures for which the Act has been used since 1949 were not mentioned in manifestos, and hence in trying to veto them the Lords were not breaking the Salisbury convention. The Hunting Bill was mentioned in the Labour Party manifesto for the 2001 general election, so, depending upon how the convention is interpreted, the attempt to block it could be taken as a breach. However, as conventions are merely convention and not law, the House of Lords would not be taking illegal action if they were to act otherwise.

The Government of Ireland Act 1914 was repealed in entirety by the Government of Ireland Act 1920, the European Parliamentary Elections Act 1999 was repealed in entirety by the European Parliamentary Elections Act 2002 and most provisions of the Sexual Offences (Amendment) Act 2000 were repealed by the Sexual Offences Act 2003. While the War Crimes Act 1991 remains in force, to date only Anthony Sawoniuk has been convicted under it.

The threat of the Parliament Acts has been employed by several British governments to force the Lords to accept its legislation. In at least three cases, the procedure authorised by the Parliament Act 1911, or by the Parliament Acts 1911 and 1949, was started, but the legislation was approved by the House of Lords as a result of the government making concessions. These were:
 Temperance (Scotland) Act 1913, which allowed the voters in a district to hold a poll to vote on whether their district went "dry" or remained "wet".
 Trade Union and Labour Relations (Amendment) Act 1976, which amended the Trade Union and Labour Relations Act 1974 to reverse changes made to that Act as it passed through Parliament.
 Aircraft and Shipbuilding Industries Act 1977, which nationalised large parts of the UK aerospace and shipbuilding industries and established two corporations, British Aerospace and British Shipbuilders.

Validity of the 1949 Act 
Since the 1949 Act became law, doubts were raised by some legal academics as to whether the use of the 1911 Act to pass the 1949 Act, which amended the 1911 Act itself, was valid. Three main concerns were raised:
 The continued ability of the House of Lords to veto a bill to prolong the life of Parliament would not be entrenched if the 1911 Act could be used to amend itself first, removing this restriction.
 The 1949 Act could be considered to be secondary legislation, since it depended for its validity on another Act, the 1911 Act; and the principle that courts will respect an Act of Parliament without enquiring into its origins (an emanation of parliamentary sovereignty) would not apply.
 Under the 1911 Act, Parliament (that is, the Commons and the Lords acting together) delegated its ability to pass legislation to another body (the Commons alone). Following legal principles established when the United Kingdom granted legislative powers to assemblies in its colonies in the late 18th century, a subordinate legislative body cannot use the Act under which legislative power was delegated to it to expand its competence without an express power to do so in the enabling Act (see Declaratory Act).

To address these concerns, a Law Lord, Lord Donaldson of Lymington, presented a private member's bill in House of Lords in the 2000–2001 session of Parliament (the Parliament Acts (Amendment) Bill), which would have had the effect of confirming the legitimacy of the 1949 Act, but prohibiting any further such uses of the Parliament Act to amend itself, or use of it to further modify or curtail the powers of the House of Lords. Another Parliament Acts (Amendment) Bill was introduced independently by Lord Renton of Mount Harry in the next session, but neither of these bills proceeded to a third reading.

The first legal challenge to the 1949 Act is believed to have been made during the first prosecution for war crimes under the War Crimes Act 1991, R. v. Serafinowicz, but no record of the legal arguments remains. Because a second defendant was prosecuted under the War Crimes Act, and was sentenced to life imprisonment and since the War Crimes Act was later amended by both two further acts (the Criminal Justice and Public Order Act 1994 and the Criminal Procedure and Investigations Act 1996), which were passed by both Houses and received royal assent, the validity of the War Crimes Act is not under question.

The 1949 Act and the validity of acts made under it were not questioned in court again until the Parliament Acts were used to pass the Hunting Act 2004. Early in 2005, the Countryside Alliance took a case to court to challenge the validity of the 1949 act. In the High Court, the wording of the 1911 act was held not to imply any entrenchment. Support for this conclusion can be drawn from the parliamentary debates on the 1911 act, in which an entrenchment clause was considered but rejected, the Government clearly displaying the intention to be able to make such amendments if necessary. However, the 2005 decision was made on other grounds, so the question of whether the courts could refer to the 1949 Act's Parliamentary debates under the principle established in Pepper v Hart was not decided.

The High Court held that the 1949 Act was primary legislation, despite being unusual in that the courts can rule on whether the provisions of the 1911 Act are complied with. It was held that the 1911 Act clearly permits the procedures specified in the Parliament Acts to be used for "any Public Bill", and this was sufficient to dispose of the argument that the 1911 Act could not be used to amend itself. The court took the view that the 1911 Act was a 'remodelling' of the constitution rather than a delegation of power.

The subsequent Court of Appeal ruling agreed that the 1949 act itself was valid, but left open the question of whether the Commons could use the Parliament Act to make significant changes to the constitution (for example, repealing the Parliament Act's provision prohibiting the act from being used to extend the lifespan of Parliament). The Court of Appeal refused to give the Countryside Alliance permission to appeal their decision to the House of Lords; however, a petition for permission to appeal was submitted directly to the Law Lords and granted in July 2005. Argument in the case was heard on 13 and 14 July 2005 by a large committee of nine Law Lords, rather than the normal five. In a unanimous decision, the Law Lords upheld the validity of 1949 Act.

Future developments 
After the "first stage" of reform of the House of Lords was implemented in the House of Lords Act 1999, the Wakeham Royal Commission on the proposal of a "second stage" of reform reported in January 2000. Subsequently, the government decided to take no action to change the legislative relationship between the House of Commons and the House of Lords.

In March 2006, it was reported that the then-Labour Government was considering removing the ability of the Lords to delay legislation that arises as a result of manifesto commitments (while the Lords still acted in accordance with a self-imposed restriction, the Salisbury Convention, which this legislation would have merely formalised), and reducing their ability to delay other legislation to a period of 60 days (although a compromise of 6 months has also been suggested). The Labour Government made no attempt to enact such changes before the 2010 general election, which Labour lost.

In May 2011, Deputy Prime Minister Nick Clegg announced the Coalition Government's plans to legislate for a mainly elected House of Lords. In the face of fierce opposition from the overwhelming majority of the Lords, he indicated that he would consider use of the Parliament Act. Ultimately this did not happen.

See also
List of Acts of the Parliament of the United Kingdom enacted without the House of Lords' consent

References

External links 

 How does the Parliament Act work? (The Guardian, 2 July 2003)
 
 

United Kingdom Acts of Parliament 1911
United Kingdom Acts of Parliament 1949
Constitutional laws of the United Kingdom
Parliament of the United Kingdom